The 2012 Palestine International Cup also 2012 Al Nakba Cup was a friendly international football tournament hosted by Palestine. National teams from Asia and Africa have been invited with many sending youth sides in preparation for upcoming youth tournaments.

Uzbekistan were drawn into Group B but withdrew before the first matchday which then meant that Sri Lanka were moved from Group A to Group C and Mauritania moved from Group C to Group B.

Participating nations

Africa
  
 

Asia
 
 
 
 
 
 
  (withdrew)

Venues

Group stage
All times are local (UTC+2).

Group A

Group B

Group C

Ranking of second-placed teams

Knockout stage

Semi-finals

Final

Goalscorers
3 goals

 Krzan Wamang Abdullah
 Khaldoun Al-Halman

2 goals

 Fahed Attal
 Alaa Ben Said

1 goal

 Hendra Bayauw
 Titus Bonai
 Irfan Bachdim
 Munther Abu Amarah
 Mossab Al-Laham
 Faisal Iqbal
 Muhammad Adil
 Hussam Abu Saleh
 Barzan Shiraz
 Dominique Da Silva

1 own goal
 Yacoub Fall (For Indonesia)

Final ranking

References

2012
International Cup
2011–12 in Tunisian football
2011–12 in Pakistani football
2011–12 in Iraqi football
2012 in Vietnamese football
2011–12 in Indonesian football
2012 in Mauritanian sport
2011–12 in Jordanian football
2011–12 in Sri Lankan football